Bogon may refer to:

Places
 Bogon, Kale, a village in western Burma
 Bogon, Shwegu, a village in north-eastern Burma
 Bogon Islet, a South Pacific islet in the Enewetak Atoll

Other uses
 Bogon filtering, the filtering of bogus IP addresses (bogon space)

See also
 Bogong moth
 Bogus (disambiguation)
 Bogo (disambiguation)
 Fake (disambiguation)
 BogoMips, an unscientific measurement of CPU speed made by the Linux kernel
 Bogosort, a particularly ineffective sorting algorithm
 Bogan (sometimes pronounced bogon) an Australian and New Zealand slang word